The DR Class 01.5 was the designation given by the Deutsche Reichsbahn in East Germany to express train locomotives that were 'reconstructed' from those of the pre-war DRG Class 01.

History 

In 1962 the repair shop (Reichsbahnausbesserungswerk) of RAW Meiningen rebuilt 35 Class 01 engines. At that time the locomotives were still vital for heavy passenger train duties, but the locomotive frame and boiler were so worn that it was essential to replace them. Like the DB rebuilds in West Germany after the Second World War, only those locomotives with more powerful brakes (i.e. those from no. 01 102 onwards) and 1000 mm carrying wheels were converted.

The rebuild did not just involve the installation of a new boiler; the entire locomotive underwent modification. The most obvious external change was the steam space cover running the length of the boiler barrel and copied from the ČSD Class 477.0, which lent the locomotives a sleek, modern appearance. The large smoke deflectors too were replaced by smaller ones with the upper front corners clipped off at an angle.

The new boiler made the so-called Reko-01 (Reko is short for Rekolokomotive) into the most powerful German express train steam locomotive. In addition to a combustion chamber and the well-known IfS mixer-preheater, the 01.5's boiler was fitted with three full bore boiler safety valves (Ackermann valves, nominal width 60). The engines were given Trofimoff valves and, apart from 01 501 and 01 520, new welded cylinders. The new boiler came with a new, welded driver's cab with upholstered seats, side-pull regulator and other improvements to the working conditions of the locomotive crew, as well as an Indusi system. The latter was required for the border-crossing traffic to  Bebra and Hamburg-Altona and services on the Dresden-Berlin line. Because the coupled wheelsets on many engines had to be replaced due to fractured spokes, eight examples (502, 504, 508, 509, 511, 513, 517, 518) were fitted with Boxpok wheels made of cast iron, like those already used in the Soviet Union and the United States. These did not prove themselves, however, due to manufacturing defects and were later swapped out for spoked wheels from retired 01s. In order to hide the ugly wheelsets, the Boxpok locomotives and several other vehicles were fitted with full skirts.

From locomotive number 01 519, all the locomotives were given oil-firing systems when rebuilt, which enabled a further increase in performance. Apart from the seven engines at Berlin Ostbahnhof locomotive depot, all the other engines were later converted to primary oil-firing. The tenders could carry 13.5 tonnes of heavy fuel oil. During the course of the oil crisis in the early 1980s all the oil-fired locomotives were withdrawn. All of the locomotives were originally meant to remain in service for two maintenance periods (each of 6 years), however every locomotive exceeded this. After they were withdrawn from active duty, several engines were used as heating locomotives. Number 01 519 was refurbished in 1990-91 from being a heating engine, and was made fully operational by the DR. It was not taken out of service until 1991.

Accident 

Number 01 516, at the time already sporting its computer number 01 1516-2, achieved regrettable notoriety, when on 7 November 1977 its boiler exploded at Bitterfeld station due to a lack of water, killing not only the crew of 2, but another 7 bystanders, and injuring more than 50 people. This was the last boiler explosion in Germany. Such a mishap had been seen at the time as inconceivable because the technical condition of the boilers was checked thoroughly and it was believed that appropriately trained crews - not least for their own interests - would follow the proper safety procedures.

On a similar journey with experienced staff in spring 1978 an attempt was made to investigate the circumstances of the accident. The DR's investigation report, which was not made public, showed that the regular engine driver was being retrained as an electric locomotive driver and had been replaced by an engine driver who was more actively involved in everything. Because the stoker formed a close-knit team with his regular driver and was not used to this situation, a lack of communication led to a shortage of water on the approach to Bitterfeld station.

The accident had no knock-on effect on the employment of steam locomotives in the GDR.

Preserved locomotives 
Five DR Class 01.5 steam locomotives have been preserved (as at 08/2008):

 01 509 – Preßnitztalbahn, oil-fired, currently being refurbished at the Meiningen Steam Locomotive Works
 01 514 – Technik Museum Speyer
 01 519 – Zollernbahn Railway Friends
 01 531 – DB Museum; museum loco at Arnstadt locomotive depot.
 01 533 – ÖGEG / Austria (operational)

Fleet list

See also 
 List of East German Deutsche Reichsbahn locomotives and railbuses
 Rekolok

Literature 
 
 
 
 
 
 

01.5
4-6-2 locomotives
01.5
Railway locomotives introduced in 1962
Passenger locomotives
Standard gauge locomotives of Germany
2′C1′ h2 locomotives